Alexander Smith (6 February 1930 – July 2021) was a British trade unionist.

Smith studied with the Clothing Institute in 1958, before becoming prominent in the National Union of Tailors and Garment Workers (NUTGW). In 1974, he was elected Assistant Secretary of the union, then in 1979, he was elected as General Secretary.

In 1991, Smith led the union into a merger with the GMB Union. He then became National Officer of the GMB, and served a term as President of the Trades Union Congress. He died in 2021.

References

1930 births
2021 deaths
General Secretaries of the National Union of Tailors and Garment Workers
Members of the General Council of the Trades Union Congress
Presidents of the Trades Union Congress